Wilton Graff (born Wilton Calvert Ratcliffe; August 13, 1903 – January 13, 1969) was an American actor.

Early years 
The son of Mr. and Mrs. Joseph P. Graff, he was born Wilton Calvert Ratcliffe in St. Louis, Missouri, US. He graduated from West Hartford High School in 1921.

Career 
Before he became an actor, Graff worked for newspapers, including The Hartford Times, The Springfield Republican, and the Paris Herald.

Graff debuted on Broadway in Fantasia (1933). His last Broadway appearance was in Gabrielle (1941). He began working in movies in the 1940s and eventually appeared in dozens, usually as a professional man or an authority figure, such as a military officer. He starred in only one film, Bloodlust!, playing against type as an obvious, deranged villain. Most of his work in the last 10 years of his career was on television.

In 1956, he guest starred on James Arness’s TV Western Series Gunsmoke, as “Troy Carver”, in the episode “20-20” (S1E19) as an aging lawman losing both his eyesight and his faith in his ability to handle his job.

Personal life 
 
Graff was married twice, firstly to Mary Goodwin, from August 6, 1938, until her death on April 11, 1950. They had one child, Nancy Graff. On June 12, 1952, he married Elizabeth W. Wilson, and they remained together until his death.

Death 
Graff died in Pacific Palisades, California on January 14, 1969. He was 65 years old.

Partial filmography 

 Earl of Puddlestone (1940) – Mr. Thayer (uncredited)
 Jungle Queen (1945, Serial) – Courier (uncredited)
 A Royal Scandal (1945) – Russian General (uncredited)
 Earl Carroll Vanities (1945) – Mr. Thayer
 Counter-Attack (1945) – Russian Officer (uncredited)
 Gangs of the Waterfront (1945) – Police Commissioner Hogan
 Strange Confession (1945) – Brandon
 An Angel Comes to Brooklyn (1945) – Rodney Lloyd
 Pillow of Death (1945) – Police Captain McCracken
 Because of Him (1946) – Stage Manager (uncredited)
 Just Before Dawn (1946) – Alexander 'Alec' Girard (uncredited)
 The Phantom Thief (1946) – Rex Duncan
 Valley of the Zombies (1946) – Dr. Lucifer Garland
 Traffic in Crime (1946) – Nick Cantrell
 Avalanche (1946) – Jeremy Austin
 The Unknown (1946) – Ralph Martin
 Shadowed (1946) – Tony Montague
 Dead Reckoning (1947) – Surgeon (uncredited)
 The Web (1947) – District Attorney
 The Corpse Came C.O.D. (1947) – Maxwell Kenyon (uncredited)
 High Conquest (1947) – Mr. Douglaston
 They Won't Believe Me (1947) – Patrick Gold – Prosecuting Attorney (uncredited)
 Something in the Wind (1947) – Mr. Belton (uncredited)
 Bulldog Drummond Strikes Back (1947) – Cedric Mason
 Key Witness (1947) – Albert Loring
 Gentleman's Agreement (1947) – Maitre d' (uncredited)
 A Double Life (1947) – Dr. Mervin
 A Woman's Vengeance (1948) – Defending Counselor (uncredited)
 The Wreck of the Hesperus (1948) – Caleb Cross
 The Return of the Whistler (1948) – Dr. Bertram H. Grantland (uncredited)
 Who Killed Doc Robbin (1948) – Prosecutor
 Another Part of the Forest (1948) – Sam Taylor
 The Babe Ruth Story (1948) – Dr. Beldon (uncredited)
 The Gentleman from Nowhere (1948) – Larry Hendricks
 The Gallant Blade (1948) – Duc, d'Orleans
 The Mozart Story (1948) – Antonio Salieri
 Family Honeymoon (1948) – Dr. Wilson (uncredited)
 The Dark Past (1948) – Frank Stevens
 Caught (1949) – Gentry (uncredited)
 Blondie's Big Deal (1949) – Joe Dillon
 Take Me Out to the Ball Game (1949) – Nick Donford (uncredited)
 Reign of Terror (1949) – Marquis de Lafayette (uncredited)
 Once More, My Darling (1949) – Mr. Frobisher
 And Baby Makes Three (1949) – Root (uncredited)
 Girls' School (1950) – Dave Vickers
 When Willie Comes Marching Home (1950) – General Chester Jans (uncredited)
 Mother Didn't Tell Me (1950) – Dr. Harold Jones (uncredited)
 Fortunes of Captain Blood (1950) – Capt. Alvarado
 Rogues of Sherwood Forest (1950) – Baron Fitzwalter
 Convicted (1950) – Dr. Agar (scenes deleted)
 The West Point Story (1950) – Lieutenant Colonel Martin
 Mr. Imperium (1951) – Andrew Bolton (uncredited)
 My True Story (1951) – George Trent
 Night Into Morning (1951) – Attorney (uncredited)
 Mask of the Avenger (1951) – Count Dimorna (uncredited)
 Young Man with Ideas (1952) – Mr. Cardy
 Fearless Fagan (1952) – Col. Horne
 Springfield Rifle (1952) – Col. George Sharpe
 Something for the Birds (1952) – Taylor
 Operation Secret (1952) – French Official
 Million Dollar Mermaid (1952) – Garvey
 The I Don't Care Girl (1953) – Florenz 'Flo' Ziegfeld (uncredited)
 Lili (1953) – M. Tonit
 Scandal at Scourie (1953) – Mr. Leffington
 So This Is Love (1953) – Henry Erlanger, Producer (uncredited)
 Miss Sadie Thompson (1953) – Governor
 A Star Is Born (1954) – Shrine Auditorium Emcee (uncredited)
 The Sea Chase (1955) – Counsel General Hepke
 The Benny Goodman Story (1956) – John Hammond Sr.
 Lust for Life (1956) – Rev. Stricker
 Something of Value (1957) – Captain Hillary (uncredited)
 Tip on a Dead Jockey (1957) – John Rusk (uncredited)
 The Restless Gun (1959) - Episode "The Cavis Boy"
 Compulsion (1959) – Mr. Steiner
 Return to Peyton Place (1961) – Dr. Fowlkes (uncredited)
 Bloodlust! (1961) – Dr. Albert Balleau
 Sail a Crooked Ship (1961) – Simon J. Harrison
 Lonnie (1963) – Mitchell

References

External links 

 
 
 

1903 births
1969 deaths
American male film actors
20th-century American male actors
Male actors from St. Louis